Shatian Township is a rural township in Ningxiang City, Hunan Province, China.

Administrative division
The Town is divided into six villages: 
 Shatian
 Shisun
 Baoyun
 Changchong
 Wuli 
 Shimei.

Geography
The township abounds in tea oil and rice wine.

Hongqi Reservoir is the largest body of water in the township.

Economy
Chinese chestnut is important to the economy.

Culture
Huaguxi is the most influential form of local theater.

Transport
The County Road X210 passes across the township southeast to northwest.

The County Road X106 passes across the township northeast to southwest.

Attractions

The Huitong Covered Bridge, built in the late Qing dynasty (16441911), is a famous scenic spot.

The Former Residence of He Shuheng, built in 1785, in the 50th year of the Kangxi Region, and the Former Residence of Xie Juezai, built in the late Qing dynasty, are scenic spots in the township.

Notable former residents
Xie Juezai, politician.
He Shuheng, revolutionary.
, revolutionary.
, revolutionary.
, revolutionary.
, revolutionary.

Gallery

References

External links
 

Divisions of Ningxiang
Ningxiang